The Sumathi Best Television Investigative Reporting Award is presented annually in Sri Lanka by the Sumathi Group of Campany associated with many commercial brands for the best Sri Lankan investigative reporting of the year in television screen.

The award was first given in 2011, with the influence of Civil War investigations taken place at the battle front in 2009. The award is given to the best two investigative reporting television channel. Following is a list of the winners of this prestigious title since then.

Awards

References

Awards established in 2011
2011 establishments in Sri Lanka